Son of Cheep Thrills is a compilation album by Frank Zappa, with material from previously released albums.

Track listing
All tracks by Frank Zappa, except as noted.

"WPLJ" (Ray Dobard, Luther McDaniel) – 2:52 (from Burnt Weeny Sandwich, 1970)
"Twenty Small Cigars" – 2:17 (from Chunga's Revenge, 1970)
"The Legend of the Golden Arches" – 3:27 (from Uncle Meat, 1969)
"Ya Hozna" – 6:26 (from Them or Us, 1984)
"It Just Might be a One-Shot Deal" – 4:16 (from Waka/Jawaka, 1972)
"Love of My Life (Live version)" – 2:15 (from Tinsel Town Rebellion, 1981)
"Disco Boy (Live soundtrack version)" – 3:51 (from Baby Snakes, 1979 (Film)/1983 (Soundtrack))
"Night School" – 4:47 (from Jazz from Hell, 1986)
"Sinister Footwear 2nd Mvt. (Live version)" – 6:26 (from Make a Jazz Noise Here, 1991)
"The Idiot Bastard Son (Live version)" – 2:39 (from You Can't Do That on Stage Anymore Vol. 2, 1988)
"What's New in Baltimore?" – 5:20 (from Frank Zappa Meets the Mothers of Prevention, 1985)

Personnel
Joe Black - Compiler
David Greenberg - Intramural sports
Toby Mountain - Sampler mastered by
David Baker - Pre-taping audience warm-up
Cal Schenkel - Artwerks

References

1999 compilation albums
Frank Zappa compilation albums
Rykodisc compilation albums